{{speciesbox
| name = Bridges's degu
| image = 
| status = VU
| status_system = IUCN3.1
| status_ref = (includes ricardojedai)
| genus = Octodon
| species = bridgesii
| authority = Waterhouse, 1845
| synonyms = 
}}

Bridges's degu (Octodon bridgesii) is a species of rodent in the family Octodontidae. It is found in southern Chile. The species was named after Thomas Bridges.

 Taxonomy 
Ricardo Ojeda's degu (O. ricardojedai), which is found in Argentina and Chile, was formerly considered a population of O. bridgesii'', but was described as a distinct species in 2020.

Biology and physiology

Unlike its close relative, the common degu, Bridges' degu is nocturnal.

Bridges's degu has deep molar indentations and has a deep fold on the inside of the last molar.

Habitat
The species is less widely distributed in Chile than the common degu and inhabits rocky, forested areas and some open farmland, although it is far less well adapted for digging but does have some climbing ability. Deforestation may be contributing to the decline of this species.

References

Octodon
Mammals of Patagonia
Mammals of Chile
Mammals described in 1845
Taxonomy articles created by Polbot
Taxobox binomials not recognized by IUCN 
Endemic fauna of Chile